Acacia dodonaeifolia, also known as the hop leaved wattle, sticky wattle and the hop bush wattle, is a shrub or tree belonging to the genus Acacia and the subgenus Phyllodineae. It is native to an area along the south coast of South Australia and Victoria.

The plant tends to divide near the base to form a series of main stems. It flowers from July to November producing yellow flowers, it fruits from December to January.

See also
 List of Acacia species

References

dodonaeifolia
Flora of South Australia